Justice Snow may refer to:

Ernest A. Snow (1876–1927), associate justice of the Michigan Supreme Court
Leslie Perkins Snow (1862–1934), associate justice of the New Hampshire Supreme Court